Raúl Brancaccio (born 4 May 1997) is an Italian tennis player.

Brancaccio has a career high ATP singles ranking of world No. 121 achieved on 13 February 2023. He also has a career high ATP doubles ranking of world No. 255 achieved on 15 October 2018.

Career
Brancaccio made his ATP main draw debut at the 2021 Emilia-Romagna Open after qualifying for the singles main draw.

He won his second Challenger title at the 2023 Open Nouvelle-Calédonie in Noumea, New Caledonia defeating Laurent Lokoli.

Personal life
Brancaccio has a Spanish mother and an Italian father. His sister Nuria Brancaccio is also a tennis player.

Challenger and Futures/World Tennis Tour Finals

Singles: 12 (8–4)

References

External links

1997 births
Living people
Italian male tennis players
People from Torre del Greco
Italian people of Spanish descent
Sportspeople from the Province of Naples
21st-century Italian people